Kateřina Bukolská (born 6 March 1997) is a Czech ice hockey player and member of the Czech national ice hockey team, currently playing with Leksands IF Dam of the Swedish Women's Hockey League (SDHL).

Bukolská represented the Czech Republic at the IIHF Women's World Championship Top Division tournaments in 2016, 2017, and 2021, and at the Division I Group A tournament in 2015. As a junior player with the Czech national under-18 team, she participated in the IIHF Women's U18 World Championships in 2013, 2014, and 2015, serving as an alternate captain in 2013 and 2015.

References

External links
 
 
 Kateřina Bukolská at Hokej.cz 

1997 births
Living people
Czech expatriate ice hockey players in Canada
Czech expatriate ice hockey players in Sweden
Czech expatriate ice hockey players in the United States
Czech women's ice hockey forwards
Ice hockey players at the 2022 Winter Olympics
Leksands IF Dam players
Merrimack Warriors women's ice hockey players
Olympic ice hockey players of the Czech Republic
Ice hockey people from Prague
Stanstead College alumni